"Hibiscus on the Sleeping Shores" is a poem from Wallace Stevens's first book of poetry, Harmonium. It was first published in 1921 and is therefore in the public domain.

Interpretation

The subject of the poem is boredom of an afternoon and being saved
from it by focus on an experience of brilliant color. The poetry of
the subject upsets traditional expectations, especially in the first
and last lines. Stevens is experimenting with iconoclasm. The informality and familiarity of "I say now,
Fernando" puts the reader off balance, and the last line provokes the
belle-lettrist who finds that in this poem Stevens "goes over to the Chinese". For such a critic the poem lacks an appropriately "lacquer
finish" and is "marred by the intrusion in the last line of the
critical adjective 'stupid'".

‘Wink most when critics wince’, one might say, paraphrasing from "A High-Toned Old Christian Woman".

Notes

References 

 Buttel, H. Wallace Stevens: The Making of Harmonium. 1967: Princeton University Press.

1921 poems
American poems
Poetry by Wallace Stevens